Jacques Ploncard (13 March 1910 – 20 February 2005), also called "Jacques Ploncard d'Assac", was a French writer and journalist and a political activist – he was, among other things, a member of the Parti Populaire Français. Following the fall of the Vichy regime, he escaped to Portugal's Estado Novo in 1945, where he counselled Salazar. He introduced Yves Guérin-Sérac, one of the co-founders of the OAS, to the PIDE. After the April 1974 Carnation Revolution, he returned to France and collaborated on Présent, a newspaper which maintained loose links with Jean-Marie Le Pen's National Front. Jacques Ploncard also wrote Doctrines of Nationalism.

Selected bibliography
 Pourquoi je suis anti-juif (Why I Am Anti-Jew), 1938
 La Franc-maçonnerie ennemie de l'Europe (Freemasonry, Europe's Enemy), 1943
Doctrines du nationalisme, 1958
 Salazar, 1967
Under the pen-name "La Vouldie":
 Mme Simone de Beauvoir et ses mandarins (Madame Simone de Beauvoir and her Mandarins), 1955

1910 births
2005 deaths
People from Chalon-sur-Saône
French Popular Party politicians
People affiliated with Action Française
People of Vichy France
French Integralism
Order of the Francisque recipients
French male non-fiction writers
20th-century French journalists
20th-century French male writers